Bridgwater Friary was a Franciscan monastery in Bridgwater, Somerset, England, established in 1245 and dissolved in 1538.

It was founded by William Briwere and moved from another location. Further buildings were added in 1278 and 1284. The church was rebuilt in the 15th century and consecrated in 1445. After the dissolution of the monasteries it became a mansion house. There have been various attempts to excavated the site with decorated tiles, and other building fragments now in the Blake Museum. The only visible remains are an old door in Silver Street.

The site is also crossed by a linear feature thought to date from the English Civil War.

References

Monasteries in Somerset
1245 establishments in England
1538 disestablishments in England
Franciscan monasteries in England
Bridgwater
Christian monasteries established in the 13th century